American Tractor Corporation (ATC) was an American manufacturer of tracked type agricultural and industrial tractors based in Churubusco, Indiana. Their tractors were marketed using the "Terra" prefix before a descriptive term. The bulldozers were referred to as Terra Dozers, the general purpose tractors Terra Tracs and the backhoes Terra Hoes. ATC was purchased by the J. I. Case Company in 1957 primarily to obtain ATC's unique backhoe design.

History
In 1950 Marc Rojtman purchased the crawler manufacturing from Warren, Ohio based Federal Machine. He purchased a building in Churubusco, Indiana, to house his company and relocated the operation there. Working 15‑hour days along with his employees allowed ATC to grow by 1951 to $3 million in sales.

By the mid-1950s ATC was building six different chassis with equipment ranging from forklifts to earthmoving and even a three-point hitch, rare on crawler tractors.

In 1957 J. I. Case made an offer to merge ATC into Case. This was mutually advantageous as ATC had innovative designs but lacked a strong distribution network whereas Case had not had success in the crawler market, but had an international distribution network. Of particular interest to Case was the backhoe that ATC had developed for its machines. Within the year Case had married the ATC backhoe to a Case 300 series tractor with a loader creating the first factory built and integrated loader backhoe in the American market.

External links 
 Tractordata.com ATC

References 

1950 establishments in Indiana
Companies based in Indiana
Agriculture companies of the United States
Vehicle manufacturing companies established in 1950
Tractor manufacturers of the United States
American companies established in 1950